The Selling Wizard is a 1954 commercial short film presented by Anheuser-Busch that runs for 10 minutes to showcase large modern freezers that make it easier for grocers to sell their goods and make higher profits. It is aimed at businesses that require display freezers for their products. The narrator makes points of the promoted freezer cabinet to utilize efficient design in space saving, modernized refrigeration methods, and attractive presentation of products stored in the freezer. The title comes from a spokeswoman next to the freezer who is dressed as a wizard with a wand and in revealing clothes who does not talk but motions with the narration.

In popular culture
It is satirized on an episode of Mystery Science Theater 3000 as a short paired with the movie The Dead Talk Back.

External links

1954 films
1954 short films
Sponsored films
Anheuser-Busch
American short films